The Ford City Armory is a historic National Guard armory located at 301 Tenth Street in Ford City, Armstrong County, Pennsylvania.   It was designed by architect Joseph F. Kuntz.  It was built in 1930.  It is a work of builder Clyde Hatten.

It is a one-story, "T"-plan building in Moderne style.  It is 10 bays by 9 bays, sits on a cement foundation, and has a hipped roof.

It was listed on the National Register of Historic Places in 1989.

The building was sold in 1996.  It now hosts the Pennsylvania National Guard Military Museum.

References

Armories on the National Register of Historic Places in Pennsylvania
Moderne architecture in Pennsylvania
Government buildings completed in 1930
Military and war museums in Pennsylvania
National Register of Historic Places in Armstrong County, Pennsylvania
1930 establishments in Pennsylvania
Pennsylvania National Guard
National Guard (United States) museums